Caidin is a surname. Notable people with the surname include:

Eric Caidin (1952–2015), American collector of film memorabilia 
Martin Caidin (1927–1997), American author and screenwriter